Falco Kapuste (born 1943) is a German former ballet dancer and choreographer.

Kapuste was educated at the University of Music and Theatre in Hanover.

Kapuste has danced with Hamburg State Opera, Deutsche Oper Berlin, and Rhine Opera from 1970.

References

External links

1943 births
Living people
German male ballet dancers
German choreographers
20th-century German ballet dancers